The Cheerleader is a 1973 coming of age novel by Ruth Doan MacDougall.

Described on the author's website as "searchingly honest, achingly real, [recalling] all the joy, excitement, and pain of crossing the bridge from childhood to young womanhood in the Fabulous Fifties, when sex was still a mystery and goals were clearly defined--perhaps for the last time," it was first published in 1973 by Putnam and re-released in its 4th printing in 1998 by Frigate Books.

This is the first of five books in the "Snowy Series" ("Snowy: a sequel to The Cheerleader," "Henrietta Snow," "The Husband Bench, or Bev's Book," and "A Born Maniac, or Puddles Progress")  following Snowy and "The Gang" as they continue through life.

References 

1974 American novels
American bildungsromans